USVA may refer to:

Geography 
 Usva, an urban locality in Perm Krai, Russia
 Usva (river), a river in Perm Krai, Russia
 Virginia, a state in the United States (US) with the initials VA

Other uses 
 United States Department of Veterans Affairs
 United States Department of Veterans Affairs emblems for headstones and markers
 USVA, initials of the former name of Valenciennes FC, a French association football club